The Pine Bluff Commercial Historic District encompasses a portion of the historic city center of Pine Bluff, Arkansas.  It extends from Barraque Street south along Main Street, extending in places to properties alongside streets.  The area's commercial development began about 1840, when the courthouse square was laid out at Barraque and Main, and proceeded through the early 20th century.  Most of the commercial properties of the district were built between 1880 and 1910, and are reflective architecturally of late 19th-century commercial building styles.

The district was listed on the National Register of Historic Places in 2008.  Properties previously listed on the Register and included in the district are the Merchants and Planters Bank Building, Union Station, the Community Theatre, the Masonic Temple, and the Hotel Pines.

See also

National Register of Historic Places listings in Jefferson County, Arkansas

References

Historic districts on the National Register of Historic Places in Arkansas
Jefferson County, Arkansas
National Register of Historic Places in Pine Bluff, Arkansas
Victorian architecture in Arkansas